Pingshan District is a district of Shenzhen, Guangdong.

History
Pingshan  was established as a New District on June 30, 2009, by the Shenzhen municipal government. This new district superseded the old plan which was initiated back in 1994 and began construction in 1997. It was still part of Longgang District in administrative management. On October 11, 2016, Pingshan was officially separated from Longgang to become a district itself.

Located southwest of the Huanping community in Pingshan New District, the Dawan Ancestral Residence is one of the biggest Hakka buildings in China. It was built by the Zeng family in 1791 during the reign of the Qianlong Emperor in the Qing dynasty.

In Summer 2018, The Pingshan District made international news after a group of workers from The Jasic manufacturing plant went on strike and demonstrated along with student activists from the Jasic Solidarity Support Group. The event is referred to as The Jasic Incident.

Economy
The car manufacturer BYD has its headquarters on BYD Road, Pingshan New District., as does the plastic injection mold-maker Shenzhen Changhong Technology Co., Ltd., and technology company Jasic Technology Company Ltd.

Subdistricts

Geography
Pingshan New District is situated in the north-eastern part of Shenzhen city. It is next to Huizhou City in the east.

Education

Shenzhen Technology University is in the district.

Schools operated by the Shenzhen municipal government
 Shenzhen Senior High School East Campus (东校区)

See also
Guangdong
Guangming New Area
Longgang District

References

External links

Pingshan New District official government website 

Districts of Shenzhen